Pencho is a masculine given name . Bearers include:

 Pencho Georgiev (1900–1940), Bulgarian painter, scenographer and illustrator
 Pencho Slaveykov (1866–1912), Bulgarian poet
 Pencho Vichev (born 1952), Bulgarian Olympic sports shooter
 Pencho Zlatev (1881–1948), Bulgarian general and politician
 Pencho, a character in the 1920 Broadway play Spanish Love

Bulgarian masculine given names